Testament is an American thrash metal band from Berkeley, California. Formed in 1983 under the name Legacy, the band's current lineup comprises rhythm guitarist Eric Peterson, lead vocalist Chuck Billy, lead guitarist Alex Skolnick, bassist Steve Di Giorgio and drummer Dave Lombardo. Testament has experienced many lineup changes over the years, with Peterson being the only remaining original member, though they have since been rejoined by one of its songwriters Skolnick, who had been out of the band from 1992 to 2005. Billy has been a member of Testament since 1986, when he replaced original singer Steve "Zetro" Souza, who had joined Exodus as the replacement of Paul Baloff. He and Peterson are the only members to appear on all of Testament's studio albums, with the latter being the only constant member overall.

Labeled as one of the "big six" of the 1980s Bay Area thrash metal scene (along with Exodus, Death Angel, Lååz Rockit, Forbidden and Vio-lence), Testament is often credited as one of the most popular and influential bands of the thrash metal scene, as well as one of the leaders of the second wave of the genre in the late 1980s. They have also been referred to as one of the "big eight" of thrash metal, along with Metallica, Megadeth, Slayer, Anthrax, Exodus, Overkill and Death Angel. The band has sold over 1.4 million albums in the United States since the beginning of the SoundScan era and over 14 million copies worldwide. To date, Testament has released thirteen studio albums (one of which is a collection of re-recorded songs), four live albums, five compilation albums, twelve singles and three DVDs.

After signing to Atlantic Records in 1986, and changing its name from Legacy to Testament, the band released their debut album The Legacy in 1987, followed a year later by The New Order (1988); both albums were acclaimed by critics and the press, including heavy metal-related publications. The band achieved mainstream popularity with its third album Practice What You Preach (1989), which was Testament's first album to climb up the Top 100 on the Billboard 200 chart. A string of more successful albums were released during the early-to-mid-1990s, including Souls of Black (1990), The Ritual (1992) and Low (1994), with the first two also entering the Top 100 on the Billboard 200 chart. After Atlantic dropped the band in 1995, Testament (who had at this point had begun to experiment with a death metal-influenced sound) continued to record and perform until their temporary hiatus in 2001, when Billy was diagnosed with cancer. By 2005, his cancer was in remission and Testament had resumed activity, which saw a brief reunion of The Legacy lineup, resulting in the live album Live in London. Since then, Testament has experienced a resurgence of popularity, with four of their studio albums—The Formation of Damnation (2008), Dark Roots of Earth (2012), Brotherhood of the Snake (2016) and Titans of Creation (2020)—all entering the Top 100 on the Billboard 200, and they have continued to tour consistently. The band is currently working on new material for their fourteenth studio album, which is tentatively due for release in 2023.

History

Early years and first two albums (1983–1989)
The band was formed in the San Francisco Bay Area in 1983 under the name Legacy by guitarist Eric Peterson and his cousin, guitarist Derrick Ramirez. They soon added drummer Louie Clemente, vocalist Steve Souza and bassist Greg Christian and began playing club shows with bands such as Slayer, Lȧȧz Rockit, Death Angel and others. Clemente left the band in 1985 and was replaced by drummer Mike Ronchette. Derrick Ramirez departed soon after and young guitarist Alex Skolnick, who had studied under Bay Area guitarist Joe Satriani, was brought into the band. Legacy had been writing original material since forming and released a self-titled, four-song demo in 1985. Steve Souza left the band in 1986 to join Exodus and was replaced by Chuck Billy at Souza's suggestion. Mike Ronchette also left the band, and former drummer Louie Clemente returned.

The band was signed to Megaforce Records in 1986 on the strength of the demo tape. While recording their first album, the band was forced to change their name to Testament (which, according to Maria Ferrero in the May 2007 issue of Revolver, was suggested by Billy Milano of S.O.D. and M.O.D.), because the "Legacy" name was already trademarked by a hotel R&B cover band. Legacy played their last show prior to this name change at The Stone in San Francisco on March 4, 1987.

Testament's debut album, The Legacy, was released in April 1987 on Megaforce Records, and also distributed by Atlantic. They received instant fame within thrash circles and were often compared with fellow Bay Area thrash pioneers Metallica. Thanks to this, and the regular rotation of their first-ever music video "Over the Wall" on MTV's Headbangers Ball, the band quickly managed to increase their exposure by heading out on successful North American and European tours with Anthrax, who were supporting their Among the Living album. On this tour, the Live at Eindhoven EP was recorded. Testament also opened for Slayer as well as their labelmates Overkill, and Megadeth on their Peace Sells... but Who's Buying? tour.

Testament's second album, The New Order, was released in May 1988, and found the band continuing in a similar vein. The album was a minor success, peaking at number 136 on the Billboard 200, but managed to sell over 250,000 copies on the strength of the airplay of "Trial by Fire" and the cover of Aerosmith's "Nobody's Fault" (through radio and television), as well as relentless touring schedules. In support of The New Order, Testament opened for Megadeth on their So Far, So Good... So What! tour in Europe, and toured the United States with the likes of Overkill, Voivod, Death Angel, Vio-Lence, Nuclear Assault, Sanctuary, Raven, Forbidden and Heathen. They also made a number of festival appearances in the summer of 1988, such as Metalfest in Milwaukee, Aardschokdag in The Netherlands, and replaced Megadeth for some dates on the European Monsters of Rock tour, also featuring Iron Maiden, Kiss, David Lee Roth, Great White and Anthrax. By the time The New Order tour ended in early 1989, Testament had not only cemented their reputation as one of the most acclaimed thrash metal acts, but had also graduated to headlining their own shows.

Commercial breakthrough (1989–1992)
Testament released their third studio album, Practice What You Preach, in August 1989. The album minimized the occult and gothic themes found in the lyrical content of their first two albums, instead focusing on real-life issues such as politics and corruption, and while staying true to its thrash metal roots, it saw the band drawing influences from traditional heavy metal, jazz fusion and progressive/technical metal. Practice What You Preach was a commercial breakthrough for Testament, reaching at number 77 on the Billboard 200, and it was accompanied by three singles (the title track, "The Ballad" and "Greenhouse Effect") that received significant airplay from AOR radio stations and MTV's Headbangers Ball, further helping raise the band's profile. Testament toured for almost a year behind Practice What You Preach with several bands, including Overkill, Annihilator, Wrathchild America, Mortal Sin, Xentrix, Nuclear Assault, Savatage, Flotsam and Jetsam, Mordred, Dark Angel and a then-relatively unknown Primus. Despite selling over 450,000 copies, the album has never been certified gold by the RIAA.

In October 1990, Testament released their fourth studio album Souls of Black. Although reviews were mixed, the album managed to sell respectably, in no doubt largely off the strength of the single title track, and saw the band perform on arena tours, including the European Clash of the Titans tour with Megadeth, Slayer and Suicidal Tendencies. Testament supported Souls of Black with two North American tours, opening for Judas Priest on their Painkiller tour from October to December 1990, and Slayer on their Seasons in the Abyss tour from January to March 1991. They also toured Japan, and played shows with Anthrax and Sepultura. Shortly after completing the Souls of Black tour, the band released their first VHS documentary Seen Between the Lines, containing live clips recorded during the Souls of Black world tour, four promotional music videos and video interview segments.

Attempting to reconnect with an audience distracted by the growing grunge movement, Testament released The Ritual in 1992. Recorded at One on One Recording in Los Angeles under producer Tony Platt, it saw a stylistic move away from thrash to a slower, slightly more traditional heavy metal sound, and a somewhat more progressive atmosphere, with the title track being the longest song Testament had recorded up to this point. Drummer Louie Clemente acknowledged this musical change in a 1992 interview with Deseret News, explaining, "The Ritual is slower and geared toward the old style of metal while The Legacy was pure thrash. In fact, every release has been different. We've progressed naturally." Clemente said in the same interview that Platt's involvement within the album helped Testament "get more of a vibe." The Ritual peaked at number 55 on the Billboard 200, the band's highest chart position at the time, and the power ballad "Return to Serenity" managed to receive radio airplay, peaking at number 22. Despite selling more than 485,000 copies in the United States, the album has never received gold certification. In support of The Ritual, Testament toured Europe and North America, headlining their own tours, as well as opening for Iron Maiden on their Fear of the Dark tour, and Black Sabbath on their Dehumanizer tour. However, the success of the album did not put an end to the tensions within the band.

Transitional period (1992–2004)

For the remainder of the 1990s, Testament had undergone a series of changes in its lineup, as well as a change of pace in its musical style. The first member of The Legacy-era lineup to leave the band was lead guitarist Alex Skolnick, who performed his last show with them on Halloween 1992. Skolnick has stated that one of the reasons he left Testament was because he wanted to expand his musical horizons rather than continuing to play thrash metal music. A few months later, drummer Louie Clemente left the band.

Skolnick and Clemente were temporarily replaced by Forbidden members Glen Alvelais and Paul Bostaph, respectively. This lineup released the 1993 live EP, Return to the Apocalyptic City. Soon after, Alvelais quit the band and Paul Bostaph departed to join Slayer. Their next album, Low (1994), featured John Tempesta on drums and death metal guitarist James Murphy, formerly of Death, Cancer, and Obituary. Low was a diverse album, featuring various influences such as alternative, hard rock, death metal, groove metal, progressive, and as well as a ballad, "Trail of Tears". The band's remaining fans reacted favorably to the album, although it did little to expand Testament's fanbase. Some fans, however, viewed Testament's move away from the mainstream as a liberation that allowed them to expand artistically, not being pressured by sales and success as they once were. Despite the fact that the album charted lower than the band's previous three albums on the Billboard 200 at number 122, its title track "Low" received decent airplay from Headbangers Ball on MTV and the Los Angeles-based radio station KNAC, just before both outlets went off the air in early 1995. Testament toured for over a year in support of Low, playing with numerous acts such as Machine Head, Downset., Korn, Forbidden, Kreator, At the Gates, Moonspell, Crowbar, Suffocation and Gorefest. Their first full-length live album Live at the Fillmore, released in the summer of 1995, was recorded during this tour and marked their first release since they ended their eight-and-a-half-year tenure with Atlantic Records.

Tempesta left Testament after the recording of Low to join White Zombie, being replaced by Jon Dette for the following tour, though the latter would leave the band in 1995. Dette's replacement was Chris Kontos, who had formerly been part of Machine Head. This lineup is featured on the Judas Priest cover Rapid Fire. After the 1996 club tour, Greg Christian, James Murphy, and Chris Kontos departed the band. During the time Kontos was in Testament he suggested the band drop the name altogether and call the band "Dog Faced Gods". This idea was turned down by Billy and Peterson who wanted to continue with the Testament name. The two later temporarily disbanded Testament.

The band's follow-up album, Demonic, released June 1997, took a new approach, and found Testament experimenting with death metal more. The album featured Eric Peterson on both lead and rhythm guitar (although Glen Alvelais made a guest appearance, and played on the subsequent tour), early member Derrick Ramirez on bass guitar, and former Dark Angel drummer Gene Hoglan. Hoglan left before the Demonic tour to join Strapping Young Lad, with Steve Jacobs doing the South American leg of the tour and Jon Dette returning later. Hoglan's loyalty to Strapping Young Lad and his desire to not remain a member of Testament actually came to realization during a published interview the band conducted with Metal Maniacs Magazine.

By 1998, Ramirez, Alvelais and Dette had departed and James Murphy had returned for the June 1999 release of The Gathering. The rhythm section on The Gathering was highly respected, consisting of metal fretless bassist Steve Di Giorgio (formerly of Death and Sadus) and original Slayer drummer Dave Lombardo. The sound of the album was largely a combination of death metal and thrash metal, with a minor black metal influence from Eric Peterson's side project, Dragonlord.

Soon after the release of The Gathering, lead guitarist James Murphy was diagnosed with a brain tumor. Through various fundraisers, Murphy was able to afford surgery and eventually made a full recovery, but was unable to recall anything from the recording of The Gathering. In 2001, Chuck Billy was also diagnosed with germ cell seminoma, a rare form of testicular cancer, but it only affected Billy's lungs and heart.  His cancer was also treated successfully. In August 2001, friends of Billy organized the Thrash of the Titans benefit concert, featuring seminal Bay Area thrash metal bands Vio-lence, Death Angel, Exodus, Forbidden, Sadus and Heathen, as well as Anthrax, S.O.D. and Flotsam and Jetsam. The show was headlined by a Legacy reunion, featuring Steve Souza on vocals, and former guitarist Alex Skolnick, who had not played with the band since 1992, and bassist Greg Christian. Late in 2001, Testament released First Strike Still Deadly, a collection of re-recordings (with modern studio technology) of songs from their first two albums. The album featured the lineup of Billy, Peterson, Di Giorgio, the return of Alex Skolnick on guitar, and John Tempesta on drums.

By 2003, Chuck Billy had made a full recovery, and the band began performing live again with a new drummer, Jon Allen of Sadus. In 2004, the band changed their lineup once again for their summer festival appearances. Jon Allen was replaced by Paul Bostaph, returning to the band for a second stint after a decade's absence. Lead guitarist Steve Smyth departed to join Nevermore and was replaced by ex-Halford guitarist "Metal" Mike Chlasciak. Shortly after Steve Smyth's departure, Eric Peterson fell down a flight of stairs, breaking his leg, and was unavailable for some dates. He was temporarily replaced by Steve Smyth.

Reunion of classic lineup and The Formation of Damnation (2005–2010)

In May 2005, it was announced that Testament would be doing a brief Europe-only reunion tour – known as the "10 Days in May Tour" – featuring the classic lineup of Billy, Peterson, Skolnick and Christian, with drum duties shared between John Tempesta and Louie Clemente. After the success of the initial tour dates, Testament announced more dates in the U.S., Europe, and Japan with the classic lineup. Later that year, Skolnick also toured the East Coast with Trans-Siberian Orchestra. The band went on to release a live DVD and CD from the tour entitled Live in London. In interviews on the DVD, Eric Peterson expressed his desire to record the follow-up to The Gathering with the classic Testament lineup. He also stated that Alex Skolnick had begun writing songs for the new album. Chuck Billy was very vocal about how happy he was to have Alex, Greg, Louie, and John Tempesta in the band once again, and hoped to maintain a stable lineup going forward. Also in 2005, Testament's long-out of print documentary Seen Between the Lines was released on DVD for the first time.

Testament played for the first time in the Middle East at the Dubai Desert Rock festival in March 2006. Other notable bands that performed for the Desert Rock Festival were Iron Maiden, Megadeth, Reel Big Fish and 3 Doors Down.

In July 2007, the band played a show at Jaxx Nightclub in Springfield, Virginia, with Paul Bostaph filling in on drum duties. It was later confirmed that Bostaph would be officially returning to the band to record the new album. The band debuted a new song at that show titled "The Afterlife", which they also played at Earthshaker Fest.

In February 2008, the band released the song "More Than Meets the Eye" from the new album on their Myspace page.

In April 2008, Testament was confirmed for Ozzy Osbourne's Monsters of Rock festival to take place on July 26, 2008, in Calgary, Alberta, Canada.

Testament released their first studio album in nine years, The Formation of Damnation, on April 29, 2008, through Nuclear Blast Records. It was the first Testament album to feature Alex Skolnick on guitar since 1992's The Ritual, and the first to feature bassist Greg Christian since 1994's Low.

The band was confirmed to be the main event on the first day of the "Gillmanfest," a rock festival to be held on May 24, 2008, in Valencia, Venezuela, visiting Colombia for the second time in the band's extensive career. In June 2008, Testament headlined the 3rd stage at Download Festival, held at Donington Park, UK. The band also toured the US as a supporting act for Judas Priest, Heaven & Hell, and Motörhead on the "Metal Masters Tour". The band announced that they had recruited guitarist Glen Drover (ex-Megadeth and King Diamond) to fill in on their upcoming Mexican tour dates with Judas Priest, due to Alex Skolnick's prior commitment to the Trans-Siberian Orchestra.

Testament would embark on the "Priest Feast" European tour with headliners Judas Priest and Megadeth in February and March 2009. On March 25, 2009, Testament played a special one-off show at the O2 Islington Academy in London, where they performed their first two albums (The Legacy and The New Order) back-to-back, with British thrash band Sylosis in support. Also in 2009, Testament set out on a 6-week tour across the US to promote The Formation of Damnation, touring with Unearth and Lazarus A.D. In early 2010, Testament toured the United States with Megadeth and Exodus. Alex Skolnick did not participate in the tour due to previous obligations and Glen Drover again filled in for him. In the summer of 2010, the band toured Australia, and supported Megadeth and Slayer on the American Carnage Tour. Testament also headlined for the first time in the Philippines for the annual Pulp Summer Slam on April 17, 2010 with Lamb of God.

Dark Roots of Earth (2010–2013)

As early as 2009, Testament started writing new material for their tenth album. In an interview with Metalheadz, Peterson stated that there were about four songs written and that "there's other guys in the band who like to play the more rock melodic style but the next one is gonna be a bit heavier." In a January 2011 interview during the 70000 Tons of Metal cruise, Billy revealed that Testament had been working on six new songs, with four or five "maybe left to write," and would begin recording their new album by early March. On May 18, 2011, Skolnick posted an update on his Twitter, saying, "Another tune done! My riffs from last week [plus] some of [fellow Testament guitarist Eric Peterson's] plus new ones we wrote today. Planning one more, then we've got more than we need."

Testament began recording their tenth studio album on June 20, 2011. Paul Bostaph was unable to take part in the recording due to a "serious injury", although he was expected to rejoin when the band began touring to support the album. Bostaph was replaced by Gene Hoglan, who had played drums with Testament on their 1997 album Demonic.

Testament appeared at the California dates of the summer 2011 Rockstar Energy Drink Mayhem Festival, replacing In Flames.

The band toured in the fall of 2011 with Anthrax and Death Angel. Overkill was invited to the tour, but due to the pre-production of their sixteenth studio album The Electric Age, they did not participate. John Tempesta filled in for Bostaph on the tour. It was announced on December 1, 2011 that Paul Bostaph had left Testament. Gene Hoglan, who had recorded the drum tracks for the new album, was brought back after the band had expressed pleasure in his playing, hoping that he would continue with the band for the foreseeable future.

After many delays, the band's tenth studio album Dark Roots of Earth was released on July 27, 2012. The album debuted at No. 12 on the Billboard 200, their highest chart position to date. Lamb of God drummer Chris Adler made a guest appearance on the bonus track "A Day in the Death".

Dark Roots of Thrash and Brotherhood of the Snake (2013–2019)
In August 2012, Peterson stated that Testament would record an eleventh studio album if Dark Roots of Earth did well. A week prior to the release of Dark Roots of Earth, Billy promised that Testament would not take "huge gaps" between albums anymore, and would "work hard and tour for two years or so," and try to release another album when they could. Hoglan had also said that he would "absolutely dig" to be a part of the writing of the next Testament album.

On September 13, 2013, Billy told Rock Overdose that from January to April 2014, Testament would be writing and recording their eleventh studio album for a 2014 release. Testament released a live DVD/double album Dark Roots of Thrash on October 15, 2013. The release documents the band's sold-out headlining performance at the Paramount in Huntington, New York, in February 2013.

In January 2014, bassist Greg Christian left Testament again, and was replaced by a returning Steve Di Giorgio. Christian has claimed that the reasons behind his departure were because of money disputes and differences with the band.

When asked in an April 2015 interview about Testament's plans to begin recording their twelfth album, Peterson said that his "main goal" was to "get home [from tour] in June, finish it up and get in the studio by September." Billy also said that the band's goal was to have the album finished by Thanksgiving. Slovenian bassist Tilen Hudrap (Pestilence, Vicious Rumors, Paradox and Thraw) and Bay Area drummer Alex Bent (Arkaik, Dragonlord and Decrepit Birth, Battlecross) filled in for Di Giorgio and Hoglan respectively at the prestigious Canadian open-air festival Heavy Montreal in August 2015, which was attended by more than 70,000 spectators.

In May 2016, Billy confirmed their twelfth album would be entitled Brotherhood of the Snake. Of the album's lyrical content, he commented, "The Brotherhood of the Snake was actually a society about 6,000 years ago that debarred all religions. It was just a fascinating topic that caught our eye and attention and spawned a lot of songs. We're going with that vibe. There will be some songs that deviate, but the majority will be around that and aliens and religion. Then I'll probably tap into my native heritage and write some songs about that. It's not just going to be one concept, but there is some interesting stuff that we're finding to write about." Brotherhood of the Snake was released on October 28, 2016, and received generally positive reviews from critics, and scored Testament their second-highest chart position on the Billboard 200, peaking at number twenty. Shortly after its release, Testament embarked on an international tour with Amon Amarth, and toured North America in April–May 2017 with Sepultura, Prong, Infernal Tenebra and Dying Gorgeous Lies. The band also toured Europe with Annihilator and Death Angel in November and December 2017, and again in March and April 2018, with Annihilator and Vader supporting. Along with Anthrax, Lamb of God, Behemoth and Napalm Death, Testament opened for Slayer on their final North American tour, which took place in the spring and summer of 2018. Testament also performed at Megadeth's first-ever cruise called Megacruise in October 2019.

Titans of Creation and upcoming fourteenth studio album (2019–present)
By March 2017, Testament had begun writing the follow-up to Brotherhood of the Snake, with plans to release it in 2018. Billy stated in March 2018 that Testament would start working on their thirteenth studio album after they finish touring in support of Brotherhood of the Snake in August, hoping not to repeat the four-year gaps between their last three albums. He later stated that opening for Slayer on their farewell tour would be "the final lap for [them] touring" in support of Brotherhood of the Snake. Work on the follow-up album began in February 2019, and pre-production began in May with Andy Sneap as the mixer. Drummer Gene Hoglan revealed in a June 2019 interview on the "Talk Toomey" podcast that the band had finished recording the album for a 2019 or early 2020 release. Peterson later stated that it would be released in January 2020.

The band, along with Exodus and Death Angel, took part in The Bay Strikes Back tour of Europe in February and March 2020. Following the tour, Chuck Billy and his wife Tiffany tested positive for COVID-19, making him the third person to have contracted the virus during the tour following Will Carroll of Death Angel and Gary Holt of Exodus. Bassist Steve Di Giorgio was later diagnosed with COVID-19, becoming the second member of Testament to have tested positive for the condition.

Testament released their thirteenth studio album Titans of Creation on April 3, 2020. They were due to headline a US tour to promote the album, with support provided by The Black Dahlia Murder, Municipal Waste and Meshiaak, but it was postponed due to the COVID-19 pandemic. For this reason, Testament did not tour in support of Titans of Creation for over a-year-and-a-half; touring for the album was scheduled to start in the fall of 2021, with the band resuming their Bay Strikes Back tour in the US with Exodus and Death Angel, but the COVID pandemic led to its postponement to the spring of 2022. Following this was a summer European tour, which included festival appearances, as well as headlining dates with Exodus, Death Angel and Heathen, and one with Sepultura, and then the second North American leg of the Bay Strikes Back tour in the fall. The band will also co-headline the Klash of the Titans tour in Latin America with Kreator in the spring of 2023. The band will also co-headline the Klash of the Titans tour in Latin America with Kreator in the spring of 2023, followed by a European tour with Exodus and Voivod.

In a May 2020 interview with Exodus and former Legacy frontman Steve "Zetro" Souza on his "Toxic Vault" video channel, Billy was asked if he was going to write another Testament album during the COVID-19 pandemic. His response was, "We're not writing a record yet. I won't release what we're doing, but we are gonna write some stuff. Just to do something, not a record but maybe something just to have some singles." In a July 2020 interview with Australia's Riff Crew, Billy commented on his take on the possibility of writing another Testament album during the pandemic, saying, "Well, if it is truly, as someone says, a two-year period, of course, we're gonna go write another record, and when it all settles, we'll have two records… And if it had to be that long, then, yeah, we would probably consider just writing another record." Peterson reiterated Billy's comments in September 2020 that the band could work on new material before they tour to support Titans of Creation. In a March 2021 interview on Alive & Streaming, an internet podcast hosted by Death Angel guitarist Ted Aguilar, Billy confirmed that Peterson has been writing new material for what could result in the next Testament album.

On January 21, 2022, the band and longtime drummer Gene Hoglan announced on their respective social media accounts that he had once again left Testament to pursue "an exciting new chapter of [his] career and free agency, with all that it will entail." On March 1, it was announced that drummer Dave Lombardo had rejoined the band in time for the North American leg of The Bay Strikes Back tour, which became Testament's first major outing with Lombardo, who had left the band before the 1999-2000 tour for The Gathering. The band later discussed the possibility of recording a new album with Lombardo, and Billy stated in September 2022 that the band would likely begin work on it after the conclusion of The Bay Strikes Back tour.

Legacy and influence
Inspired by the new wave of British heavy metal and local Bay Area music scenes, Testament has been credited as one of the leaders of the second wave of thrash metal in the late 1980s, as well as one of the most influential Bay Area thrash metal acts. AllMusic described them as "one of the first thrash acts to emerge from the Bay Area in Metallica's wake during the '80s."

Numerous hard rock and heavy metal acts such as Aerosmith, AC/DC, Angel Witch, Black Sabbath, Boston, Deep Purple, Def Leppard, Dio, Iron Maiden, Judas Priest, Kiss, Led Zeppelin, the Michael Schenker Group, Montrose, Ozzy Osbourne (particularly the Randy Rhoads era), Raven, Samson, Saxon, Scorpions, The Sweet, Thin Lizzy, UFO (particularly the Michael Schenker era), Van Halen and Venom have been cited as an influence or inspiration behind Testament's music. The band's other musical influences include The Beatles, as well as guitar players like Jeff Beck, Chuck Berry, Jimi Hendrix, Yngwie Malmsteen, Frank Marino, Mahogany Rush, Pat Travers and Johnny Winter, and their Bay Area thrash metal contemporaries Metallica and Exodus.

Testament has influenced multiple bands, such as Pantera, Sepultura, Death Angel, Annihilator, White Zombie, Korn, Machine Head, Drowning Pool, Kataklysm, Lamb of God, Morbid Angel, Cannibal Corpse, Entombed, Gojira, Killswitch Engage, Exhorder, Havok, Evile, Blind Guardian, Sevendust, Suicidal Angels, Trivium, Nightwish, Shadows Fall, Terror, Unearth, Skeletonwitch, Warbringer, Primal Fear, Fight, Sons of Texas, Incite, Demolition Hammer, and Forced Entry.

In the video for Bowling for Soup's "Punk Rock 101", guitarist and vocalist Jaret Reddick can be seen wearing one of Testament's t-shirts.

Band members

Current members
 Eric Peterson – rhythm guitar, backing vocals  
 Chuck Billy – lead vocals 
 Alex Skolnick – lead guitar, backing vocals  
 Steve Di Giorgio – bass , backing vocals 
 Dave Lombardo – drums

Discography

 The Legacy (1987)
 The New Order (1988)
 Practice What You Preach (1989)
 Souls of Black (1990)
 The Ritual (1992)
 Low (1994)
 Demonic (1997)
 The Gathering (1999)
 First Strike Still Deadly (2001)
 The Formation of Damnation (2008)
 Dark Roots of Earth (2012)
 Brotherhood of the Snake (2016)
 Titans of Creation (2020)

References

External links

 
 

1983 establishments in California
Heavy metal musical groups from California
Musical groups established in 1983
Musical groups from Berkeley, California
Musical groups from the San Francisco Bay Area
Musical quintets
Nuclear Blast artists
 
Thrash metal musical groups from California